The 1984–85 SK Rapid Wien season was the 87th season in club history.

Squad

Squad and statistics

Squad statistics

Fixtures and results

League

Cup

European Cup

References

1984-85 Rapid Wien Season
Rapid